Alseodaphne rugosa is a species of plant in the family Lauraceae. It is native to China and north Vietnam. It grows in mixed forests in valleys. It is threatened by habitat loss.

References

Flora of China
rugosa
Endangered plants
Taxonomy articles created by Polbot